The Jalan Ayer Puteh or Jalan Sungai Kecil Illlir, State Road 906 is a major road to Kampung Sungai Kecil Hillir in Kedah, Malaysia. The road through the Bukit Tiga Ratus near Air Puteh and end at Sungai Kecil Hillir near border of Kedah–Penang.

Junction list

Roads in Kedah